Russell Ellis Hunter (April 15, 1929 – August 25, 1996) was a writer, playwright, and composer based in Denver, Colorado. He was best known for writing the story for the movie The Changeling.

External links

1929 births
1996 deaths
American male composers
20th-century American dramatists and playwrights
20th-century American composers
20th-century American male musicians